Central Thailand (Central plain) (historically also known as Siam or Dvaravati) is one of the regions of Thailand, covering the broad alluvial plain of the Chao Phraya River. It is separated from northeast Thailand (Isan) by the Phetchabun mountain range. The Tenasserim Hills separate it from Myanmar to the west. In the north it is bounded by the Phi Pan Nam Range, one of the hilly systems of northern Thailand. The area was the heartland of the Ayutthaya Kingdom (at times referred to as Siam), and is still the dominant area of Thailand, containing as it does, the world's most primate city, Bangkok.

Definition
The grouping of Thai provinces into regions follow two major systems, in which Thailand is divided into either four or six regions. In the six-region system, commonly used in geographical studies, central Thailand extends from Sukhothai and Phitsanulok Provinces in the north to the provinces bordering the Gulf of Thailand in the south, excluding the mountainous provinces bordering Myanmar to the west and the coastal provinces of the east. The four-region system includes provinces only as far north as Chai Nat, Sing Buri, and Lopburi, and extends west and east to the borders of Myanmar and Cambodia.
The central region, as defined by Royal Forest Department in 2019, consists of 18 provinces (7 provinces of Greater Bangkok, 8 provinces of South Central Thailand and 3 provinces of Western Thailand).

Administrative divisions
There are several different systems of dividing modern Thailand into different regions, which gives slightly different boundaries for Central Thailand. In the geographic six-region system, the central region includes the following 22 provinces, divided into three groups:

Greater Bangkok: Bangkok, Nakhon Pathom, Nonthaburi, Pathum Thani, Samut Prakan, Samut Sakhon, Samut Songkhram

North Central Thailand region: Kamphaeng Phet, Nakhon Sawan, Phetchabun, Phichit, Phitsanulok, Sukhothai, Uthai Thani

South Central Thailand region: Ang Thong, Ayutthaya, Chainat, Lopburi, Nakhon Nayok, Saraburi, Sing Buri; Suphanburi

The four-region system includes 26 provinces in its definition of Central Thailand. Especially for statistical purposes, these are divided into four groups:

Greater Bangkok: Bangkok, Nakhon Pathom, Nonthaburi, Pathum Thani, Samut Prakan, Samut Sakhon
Sub-Central Thailand region: Ang Thong, Ayutthaya, Chainat, Lopburi, Nakhon Nayok, Saraburi, Sing Buri
Western Thailand region: Kanchanaburi, Phetchaburi, Prachuap Khiri Khan, Ratchaburi, Samut Songkhram, Suphanburi
Eastern Thailand region: Chachoengsao, Chanthaburi, Chonburi, Prachinburi, Rayong, Sa Kaeo, Trat

The eastern region is sometimes listed as a separate region distinct from central Thailand – sometimes only the four coastal provinces, sometimes the above list excluding Nakhon Nayok. None of these regions are political subdivisions, they are only geographical or statistical groupings.

Economy

For economic statistics of central Thailand by National Statistical Office (NSO) the following six provinces are listed: 1.Ang Thong 2.Ayutthaya 3.Chai Nat 4.Lopburi 5.Saraburi 6.Sing Buri
However Nakhon Nayok province is listed by eastern Thailand.   
For FY 2018, Central Region had a combined economic output of 863.328 billion baht (US$27.85 billion), or 5.3 percent of Thailand's GDP. Ayutthaya province had an economic output of 412.701 billion baht (US$13.3 billion).

References

External links

 
Regions of Thailand